Charles Holcroft may refer to:

Sir Charles Holcroft, 1st Baronet (1831-1917), of the Holcroft Baronets
Sir Charles Anthony Culcheth Holcroft, 4th Baronet (b. 1959), of the Holcroft Baronets